Metapsychiatry is a spiritual teaching and form of psychotherapy developed by psychiatrist Thomas Hora (1914–1995) in the second half of the 20th century. Hora described it as "a scientific method of healing and education based on metaphysical concepts of man and the universe". Metapsychiatry was inspired by Hora's dissatisfaction with what he believed was psychoanalysis's failure to account for human spirituality, and his observation that psychiatric healing was often temporary. It is characterized by a hermeneutic approach.

Metapsychiatry borrows from Judeo-Christian, Zen Buddhist and Taoist religious traditions, along with theistic existentialist philosophy and phenomenology; similarities to Morita therapy have been noted. It makes a distinction between religious practice and spiritual interest. God is perceived as "limitless, infinite and non-material".

Its style originates with the assertion that "the meaning and purpose of life are to come to know reality", which is defined as "God", "Love-Intelligence" or "Infinite Mind".

The study of metapsychiatry includes the implementation of "the two intelligent questions", which seek to distinguish between experiential and spiritual existence. The first question is "What is the meaning of what seems to be?" The second question asks "What is what really is?" The aim is a reorientation from a preoccupation with material appearances toward the apprehension of spiritual reality. Metapsychiatry maintains that the problems of humankind are based on ignorance, and may be overcome through "Knowledge of the truth of what really is." Problems are viewed as psychological; answers are spiritual. Metapsychiatry holds that suffering is the product of self-confirmatory thought, the insistence on affirming one's existence, and that relief from suffering is realized through enlightened transcendence of the material world. 

The qualities of peace, assurance, gratitude and love (PAGL) are cited as indicating a state of spiritual consciousness.

Professional life of Thomas Hora 
Hora was born in Hungary in 1914, where he earned his medical degree. In 1945, he attended the Postgraduate Center for Mental Health in New York, and received the Karen Horney Award for the Advancement of Psychoanalysis in 1958.

Notes

References
Chervenkova, Velizara, Japanese Psychotherapies: Silence and Body-Mind Interconnectedness in Morita, Naikan and Dohsa-hou, Springer, December 26, 2017
 Hora, Thomas, Dialogues in Metapsychiatry, PAGL Press, Orange, California, August 1, 1986
Leach, Michael, 25 Really Good Reasons to Love the Faith, Live the Faith, and Share the Faith, Loyola Press, September 1, 2016
Menahem, Sam, The Great Cosmic Lesson Plan: Healing Through Spirituality, Humor and Music, Balboa Press, Mar 18, 2015
Rinehart, Christie Walter, Love and Compassion, 2009
Tyrrell, Bernard, Christotherapy II: The Fasting and Feasting Heart, Wipf and Stock Publishers, March 11, 1999

Further reading
 Hora, Thomas, Existential Metapsychiatry, PAGL Foundation, August 1, 2002
 Hora, Thomas, Beyond the Dream: Awakening to Reality, Crossroad, October 1, 1996
 Kerievsky, Bruce S., Metapsychiatry and the Elusive Truth of Being, Journal of Religion and Health, Vol. 39, No. 1 (Spring, 2000), pp. 51-55

External links
 pagl.org
 The Meta View

Psychotherapies
Spirituality